Fujikawa Maru was a refrigerated cargo ship originally built in 1938 for the Toyo Kaiun Kisen Kaisha and was requisitioned by the Imperial Japanese Navy during World War II for use as an auxiliary armed aircraft transport or ferry. She was rerated as an auxiliary transport 1 January, 1944. She was sunk in Truk Lagoon in 1944 during Operation Hailstone and is now a leading wreck diving site for scuba divers.

History

Fujikawa Maru was requisitioned in 1940 by the Imperial Japanese Navy, and was based in Indo-China under the command of the 11th Fleet.  She saw service in the Battle of Midway as part of AiRon 7.  On 12 September 1943 she was hit by a torpedo fired by the United States submarine , and returned to Japan for repairs.  Subsequently on 5 December 1943 she was hit by torpedo bombers from the aircraft carrier  suffering minor damage.  From thence she was taken to Truk Lagoon (now Chuuk Lagoon) to undergo repairs.

On 17–18 February 1944 she was hit repeatedly by US bombers and torpedo bombers as part of Operation Hailstone, before she finally sank on 18 February at approximately 7:15am.

Dive site
Fujikawa Maru is regarded as the best scuba diving site in Chuuk Lagoon by both of the principal authors who have undertaken comprehensive surveys of the lagoon, Dan E. Bailey and Klaus Lindemann.

Amongst the more striking features on the wreck are at least nine disassembled Mitsubishi fighter aircraft in one of the forward holds. Eight of the aircraft are A6M Zeros and the ninth is an A5M Claude, the sole known survivor of the type.  The vessel also boasts a  bow gun, left over from the Sino-Japanese war and retrofitted.

The Times named it as one of the top 10 wreck dives in the world, and Aquaviews ranked it as the fourth best wreck dive in the world.

In media

 "Graveyard of the Atlantic...Graveyard of the Pacific," a 1991 episode of the PBS television series Return to the Sea, includes footage of a dive on the wreck of Fujikawa Maru.

Footnotes

References

External links
Wrecks of Truk Lagoon – The Fujikawa Maru
Return to the Sea Episode 105 "Graveyard of the Atlantic...Graveyard of the Pacific" at OceanArchives (Fair use policy for video at OceanArchives)

Ships built by Mitsubishi Heavy Industries
World War II shipwrecks in the Pacific Ocean
Maritime incidents in February 1944
1938 ships
Ships sunk by US aircraft
Wreck diving sites
Shipwrecks of Truk Lagoon